Inga  "Ine" Schäffer (later - Mayer Bojana) (March 28, 1923 – April 2009) was an Austrian athlete who competed mainly in the Shot put. She was an Austrian champion in shot put, javelin, and discus. Between 1943 and 1950, she beat Austrian track and field records five times. She represented Austria in the 1948 Summer Olympics held in London, United Kingdom in the shot put, where she won the bronze medal. Schäffer immigrated to Canada in 1952, and later taught physical education in British Columbia. She married former assistant coach Karl Spreitz in 1953. She died in Victoria, B.C. in 2009.

References

External links 
 

1923 births
2009 deaths
Austrian female shot putters
Olympic bronze medalists for Austria
Athletes (track and field) at the 1948 Summer Olympics
Olympic athletes of Austria
Medalists at the 1948 Summer Olympics
Olympic bronze medalists in athletics (track and field)
Austrian emigrants to Canada